Kresse Anne-Marie Wesling  (born ) is a Canadian-born British entrepreneur and co-founder of the luxury recycled accessories company Elvis and Kresse. She has been a visiting professor at the University of Oxford's Said Business School.

Early life and education
She studied politics and East Asian studies at McGill University in Canada from 1996 to 1999.

Career
Wesling founded an environmental packaging company in Hong Kong in 2002, and brought it to the UK in 2004. She was then involved in a sustainable mother and baby company, Babaloo, and a clothing company, Yew Clothing.

Wesling met members of the London Fire Brigade at a training course and learned, in conversation, that their discarded fire hoses went to landfill. As the hose has a maximum permitted life of 25 years, this represented a large quantity of rubber hose being discarded each year. She and her partner "Elvis" (real name James Henrit) investigated possible uses for the material and, in 2005, set up their company Elvis and Kresse to make handbags and other accessories. The company donates half its profits to the Firefighters' Charity. From 2017 they worked with the Burberry Foundation to use offcuts from the international leather industry, turning waste material into luxury goods.

The company is based in a mill built in 1837 in Tonge, Kent.

Wesling has said that the greatest influence on her "sustainability thinking" was her grandmother, who grew up on a farm where "they had to grow their own vegetables in the summer or they wouldn't have food in the winter. Her generation didn’t waste anything and that attitude characterised her whole life."

Recognition
In 2011 Wesling was awarded the Cartier Women's Initiative Awards for Europe.

Wesling was appointed MBE and was appointed CBE in the 2021 Birthday Honours "For services to Sustainable Business".

References

External links
Elvis & Kresse website

1970s births
Year of birth missing (living people)
Living people
British businesspeople
British women in business
Businesspeople from Edmonton
McGill University alumni
People educated at a United World College